Fox College Hoops (also known as Fox CBB or Fox Primetime Hoops for games airing in primetime hours) is the branding used for Fox Sports broadcasts of college basketball for Fox, FS1 and FS2. Formally college basketball telecasts have also been carried by the Fox Sports Networks (FSN) and FX in the past (sometimes generically under the title College Hoops), the Fox College Hoops branding was introduced in 1994.

Games on Fox and FS1 include rights to the Big East, Big Ten, Pac-12 and Mountain West as well as the early-season Fort Myers Tip-Off, Las Vegas Invitational, Crossroads Classic and Las Vegas Classic.

History 
In 2013, Fox reached a 12-year deal to broadcast games from the Big East Conference (whose non-football schools had broken away from the conference under the Big East name, with the remainder becoming the American Athletic Conference). CBS Sports sub-licensed rights to additional Big East games, mostly airing on CBS Sports Network.

Since 2014, as part of its contract with the conference, Fox holds rights to 22 Pac-12 basketball games per-season, and splits coverage of the Pac-12 men's basketball tournament with ESPN and Pac-12 Network.

In 2014, the main Fox broadcast network first aired the early-season Las Vegas Invitational and Las Vegas Classic events. The following year, Fox Sports bought both events outright.

In 2017, Fox added coverage of selected Big Ten Conference games as part of a larger six-year contract, alongside ESPN and CBS, which had also given it rights to the conference's top football package. Fox Sports continues to operate Big Ten Network, which has carried Big Ten games since its launch in 2007.

Beginning in the 2020–21 season, Fox holds a share of the Mountain West Conference's basketball and football packages, split with CBS. To open the 2021–22 season, Fox aired six simultaneous Big East games on November 9, 2021, with all games streaming online, and "whiparound" coverage airing on FS1. The network planned an unconventional broadcast for a November 23 game featuring Mark Titus and Tate Frazier (of the Fox Sports-distributed podcast Titus & Tate) commentating the game in the style of a podcast.

On August 18, 2022, Fox renewed its rights to the Big Ten under a seven-year deal beginning in 2023–24, maintaining 45 men's basketball games per-season on Fox and FS1, as well as selected women's games. In October 2022, Fox also renewed its rights to the Big 12 Conference, adding rights to a package of basketball games for Fox and FS1.

For the 2022–23 season, Fox added a package of Saturday primetime games branded as Fox Primetime Hoops, and announced that six women's basketball games would air on the network—including the first Big Ten women's basketball games to air on Fox.

Coverage overview 
Fox Sports Networks (1998–2020)
Pac-12 Conference (1998–2013)
Big 12 Conference (1998–2020)
Conference USA (2012, 2014–2016)
Big East (2013–2020)
Battle of the USS Midway (2012)
BB&T Classic (2012–2013)
MSG Holiday Festival (2013)
Orange Bowl Classic (2014–2015, 2018)
Big Ten Network (2007–present)
Big Ten
Big Ten men's basketball tournament
Big Ten women's basketball tournament
Fox Sports 1 (2013–present)
Big East Conference (2013–present)
Big East men's basketball tournament (All games, 2013–2016. All games except championship 2017–present.)
Pac-12 Conference (2013–present)
Pac-12 Conference men's basketball tournament (1 Quarterfinal, 1 Semifinal, Championship, every other year, 2013–2020. 1 Quarterfinal, 1 Semifinal, every other year, 2022–present.)
Conference USA (2013–2014)
Ivy League (2014–2015)
Big Ten (2017–present)
Mountain West Conference (2020–present)
Las Vegas Invitational (2014–2019, 2021–present)
Las Vegas Classic (2014–2019)
Crossroads Classic (2014)
Orange Bowl classic (one game only, 2014–2015, 2019)
Pearl Harbor Classic/Invitational (2015–2016)
MSG Holiday Festival/Classic (2016–2018)
Under Armour Reunion (2016–2017)
Brooklyn Hoops Winter Festival (One game only, 2016)
Fort Myers Tip-Off (2018–present
Hall of Fame Classic (One game only, 2018)
Gotham Classic (2021–present)
Fox Sports 2 (2013–present)
Big East (2013–present)
Brooklyn Hoops Winter Festival (2013)
Orange Bowl Classic (2016–2019)
Las Vegas Classic (One game, 2017–2018)
Las Vegas Invitational (One game, 2021–present)
Fox (2013–present)
Big East (2013–present)
Big East men's basketball tournament (Championship, 2016–present)
Pac-12 Conference (2014–present)
Pac-12 Conference men's basketball tournament (Championship, every other year, 2022–present)
Big Ten (2017–present)
Las Vegas Invitational (Championship, 2017, 2018)
Never Forget Tribute Classic (2017, 2022)
Crossroads Classic (2017, 2021)
Fort Myers Tip-Off (2020)

Theme music
On December 7, 2018, it was announced that Fox would use John Tesh's "Roundball Rock"—the theme music of the former NBA on NBC—as its theme music for college basketball games beginning during the 2018–19 season.

Personalities

Play–by–play 
 Gus Johnson (lead play-by-play)
 Tim Brando
 Adam Amin
 Joe Davis
 Brandon Gaudin
 Kevin Kugler
 Jason Benetti
 John Fanta
 Dave Sims
 Aaron Goldsmith
 Alex Faust
 Lisa Byington

Color commentators 
 Jim Jackson (lead analyst for Fox games)
 Bill Raftery (lead analyst for FS1 games)
 Nick Bahe
 Stephen Bardo
 Donny Marshall
 Jim Spanarkel
 Casey Jacobsen

See also
 Fox College Football
 Fox Sports College Hoops '99

References

External links

Fox Sports original programming
2013 American television series debuts
2010s American television series
2020s American television series
College Hoops
College basketball on television in the United States
College Hoops